Stills Alone is the seventh studio album released in 1991 by American musician Stephen Stills. The album features Stills on acoustic and electric guitar, with minimal or no backing on the majority of the tracks. "Amazonia" features some percussion backing. The cover photograph was by Henry Diltz.

Singer/songwriter Ray Lamontagne has noted in interviews that track ten on this album, "Treetop Flyer", is the song that convinced him to pursue a career in music.

Track listing

Personnel 
 Stephen Stills – vocals, acoustic guitars, electric guitars, percussion (9)

Production 
 Stephen Stills – producer, recording (7, 9), mixing (9)
 Steve Alamio – producer 
 Howard Albert – producer, recording (1-6, 8, 10), mixing (1-8, 10)
 Ron Albert – producer, recording (1-6, 8, 10), mixing (1-8, 10)
 Gerry Tolman – producer, recording (7, 9), mixing (9), management 
 Frank Cesarano – recording (1-6, 8, 10), mixing (1-8, 10)
 Craig Brock – additional engineer 
 Jim Champagne – additional engineer
 Gordon Hookailo – additional engineer
 Mike Kloster – additional engineer
 Andris Kikuts – album layout 
 Henry Diltz – photography

References

Stephen Stills albums
1991 albums